Aami Mandir,also known as Ambika Bhawani Temple is considered as a Shakti Peetha.It is a Hindu temple of the Goddess Sati, located at Ami, a prominent village in Dighwara of Saran District in Bihar, India.

Transportation 
The nearest airport is Jayprakash Narayan Airport patna at a distance of about 57 km from the temple. The Aami Village lies on the roadside of NH 19. It connects with the major cities of Uttar Pradesh, and Bihar. Dighwara is the nearest railway station from Aami, which is about 2.5 km from the village.

References

External links 
Places of Tourist Interest in Saran District

Hindu temples in Bihar